The Treehouse is an educational point-and-click personal computer game developed for DOS and then ported to Macintosh and the FM Towns, with Windows versions arriving later. Following the success of The Playroom, Broderbund created The Treehouse, which provides more content and furthers the user's ability to explore. First released in 1991, most copies were sold in educational supply stores rather than mainstream stores that sold computer software; it included a sing-along cassette tape. It was re-released in 1996 for Windows 3.1 and Windows 95. Although the Windows version has the same general activities, the characters, interface, and locations are different.

Gameplay
The game's main characters are two opossums who at various times either want to play or take a nap. The activities within the game include music composition and learning, a music maze, a picture scene with interactive objects, a puppet show and a Monopoly-style game that teaches counting and currency concepts.

Educational goals
The game is designed for older learners than The Playroom. The subjects in the game include math, language, music, creative art and science. Children are encouraged to explore new places, learn new facts and put their creative skills to use.

Reception

Computer Gaming World gave The Treehouse five out of five stars, stating that it had a "rich, full environment" with "excellent sound effects" and placed it as one of the SPA Top Hits for Home Education. The game was given a platinum award at the 1994 Oppenheim Toy Portfolio Awards. The judges claimed that "the graphics and music are first-rate, and the activities are interactive and fun".

References

External links
Official Site

1991 video games
1992 video games
1993 video games
1995 video games
1996 video games
Broderbund games
Children's educational video games
DOS games
Apple II games
FM Towns games
Classic Mac OS games
Music video games
Video games developed in the United States
Windows games
Point-and-click adventure games
Video games about animals
Video games about toys